Bid Zard (also Romanized as Bīd Zard; also known as Bīd Zard Bālā) is a village in Jereh Rural District, Jereh and Baladeh District, Kazerun County, Fars Province, Iran. At the 2006 census, its population was 684, in 134 families.

References 

Populated places in Kazerun County